MCB Bank Limited is a Pakistani multinational commercial bank which is based in Lahore, Punjab, Pakistan. The majority of shares are owned by Pakistani conglomerate Nishat Group and Malaysian bank Maybank. The bank has a network of 1,600 branches in Pakistan.

It was incorporated by the Adamjee Group on July 9, 1947. The bank was established to provide banking facilities to the business community of South Asia. The bank was nationalized in 1974 during the government of Zulfikar Ali Bhutto. This was the first bank to be privatized in 1991 and the bank was purchased by a consortium of Pakistani corporate groups led by Nishat Group. As of June 2008, the Nishat Group owns a majority stake in the bank. The current President/CEO of the bank is Shoaib Mumtaz.

The group has a presence in the business sectors of the country such as banking, textile, cement, and insurance. Mian Muhammad Mansha is chairman of both the group and MCB. The bank has established an Islamic Banking unit to offer Shariah-compliant products and services, with dedicated Islamic banking branches in six cities

In 2005, the management of the bank abbreviated its name from Muslim Commercial Bank Limited to MCB Bank Limited to explore international markets; they were facing resistance due to the word Muslim especially from Western Countries to avail license. In 2008 the head office of MCB was shifted from MCB Tower, Karachi to Lahore in a newly constructed building, namely MCB House located at Sharea Ghous-ul-Azam, commonly known as Jail Road.

MCB, advised by Merrill Lynch, became the fourth Pakistani company (the other three being Hubco, PTCL, and Chakwal cement; they all have been delisted) to list on the London Stock Exchange when it raised US$150 million global depositary receipts.

History
In 2005, the name of the bank was changed from "Muslim Commercial Bank Limited" to "MCB Bank Limited". This need was felt because the bank was already known and popular as "MCB" among its clients and the public, and most people would prefer it too as MCB instead of its full name.

In 2008, Maybank (Malaysia) announced the acquisition of 20% of the stake in MCB Bank Limited's equity by purchasing a little more than 94 million ordinary shares from the Nishat Group.  This transaction amounted to MYR 2.17 billion (US$686 million) in value. The price paid by the Maybank was Pak. Rupees 470 per ordinary share of MCB.  As per Maybank, “The acquisition is in line with Maybank's strategy, as Malaysia's financial services leader in the region, to build its presence in key growth markets across the region.”

In 2000, the bank established its Islamic Banking Business Group and opened its first branch in 2003, by 2014 the Islamic Banking network had grown to 34 branches.  This was in addition to and separate from bank's 1,100 conventional banking branches.  In 2015, given the potential of Islamic Banking business, the bank proceeded to establish an independent but wholly owned subsidiary bank named "MCB Islamic Bank Limited", referred to as "MIB "in short.  MCB Bank Ltd appointed Raza Mansha as its first chairman of the board of directors and Ali Muhammad Mahoon as the first President of the MIB.

Credit rating 
Long Term Credit Rating of MCB Bank Ltd is June 26, 2020, maintained at AAA [Triple A] and Short-Term Credit Rating of the bank is maintained at A1+ [A one plus] by Pakistan Credit Rating Agency (PACRA).

MCB Tower 
MCB Tower, situated in Karachi, Pakistan is the former headquarters of MCB Bank Limited. The tower includes 29 floors and 3 basement floors.

MCB Islamic Bank 

MCB Islamic Bank (MIB) is a subsidiary of MCB Bank. MIB was established as a demerger from MCB and NIB Bank.

MNET Services Amalgamation with and into MCB Bank 
MNET Services (Private) Limited amalgamated with and into MCB Bank, the effective date of amalgamation was April 30, 2019.

Subsidiary companies

1. MCB Islamic Bank Limited

2. MCB Arif Habib Savings & Investments Limited 

3. MCB BOKT Non-Bank Credit Organisation” Closed Joint Stock Company”

See also 

 Economy of Pakistan
 List of banks in Pakistan

References

External links
 Dawn News
 Muslim Commercial Bank
 Dawn News

Banks established in 1947
Banks of Pakistan
Companies based in Lahore
Companies listed on the Pakistan Stock Exchange
Pakistani brands
Nishat Group
Formerly government-owned companies of Pakistan
1991 mergers and acquisitions
Multinational companies headquartered in Pakistan
Pakistani companies established in 1947